The Gerald Loeb Award for Small and Medium Newspapers was a business news reporting award conferred in 2013 and 2014, although similar awards have existed under other titles since 1974. The "Newspaper" category was awarded in 1958–1973. It was split into two categories beginning in 1974: "Small Newspapers" and "Large Newspapers". A third category, "Medium Newspapers," was created in 1987. The small and medium newspaper awards were combined together as "Medium & Small Newspapers" in 2009–2012, and "Small & Medium Newspapers" in 2013–2014. The last year newspaper categories were awarded was 2014. "Small & Medium Newspapers" was replaced by the platform-neutral category "Local" in 2015.

Gerald Loeb Award for Small Newspapers (1974–1983, 1985–2008)

 1974: Livingston V. Taylor, The Courier-Journal

Article:
"Kentucky Banks Continue Using State Funds at 4%", October 15, 1973

 1975: "Who Owns West Virginia?" by Tom Miller, The Herald-Advertiser
 1976: "The Multinational Corporations" by David R. Francis, The Christian Science Monitor

"The Multinational Corporations" was a four-part series examining the power of major companies and an analysis of their impact on the third world.

 1977: "The Alaska Pipeline" by Sally Jones and Rosemary Shinohara, The Anchorage Daily News

The team investigated the problems building and financing the Alaska oil pipeline.

 1977: "The Greenback Islands: A Look at Off-Shore Tax Havens" by Larry Kramer, The San Francisco Examiner

Kramer reported on offshore tax havens.

 1978: Harold Chucker, Minneapolis Star

Articles in Series:
"New-business capital harder to secure", July 11, 1977
"Rules restrict investment", July 12, 1977
"Few firms are finding financing easily", July 13, 1977
"Venture-capital firms back few seekers", July 14, 1977
"Purse strings tighten up", July 15, 1977

 1979: "Facing Up to Inflation" by Philip Moeller, The Courier-Journal

Articles in Series:
"The inflation battle: We can't win for losing", July 30, 1978
"How inflation game is played", July 30, 1978
"Inflation will be with us for years", July 31, 1978
"Recession's assured — is your job?", August 1, 1978
"On home front, inflation fight begins at budget", August 2, 1978
"Battling budget bulge can flatter your figures", August 3, 1978
"The Inflation Menace v. Average Joe: It's a three-round fight to the finish", August 4, 1978
"Poor Richard was wrong: A penny spent may save", August 5, 1978
"For investors, inflation is capital punishment", August 6, 1978
"Uncle Sam may not have your best interest at heart", August 6, 1978
"A home: Shelter from the inflation storm", August 7, 1978
"Techniques for big-money investing in real estate can return big money", August 7, 1978
"Don't buy a Retirement Lie", August 8, 1978
"Old belt-tightening ways may not trim today's inflation", August 9, 1978
"Cost of inflation can't b calculated in dollars alone", August 10, 1978

 1980: "Rent Control" by Joe R. Cordero and Tim W. Ferguson, Santa Ana Register
 1981: "The Chrysler Saga" by Gary M. Hector, American Banker
 1982: Phil Norman, Louisville Courier-Journal

Articles in Series:
"Sacred Cows: Power, Politics and Prices in the Milk Industry", April 12, 1981
"How milk is priced", April 12, 1981
"Confusing maneuvers lurk under price tag", April 12, 1981
"Dairymen's bold course is financed by farmers", April 13, 1981
"Attorney is called the brains behind the co-op", April 13, 1981
"Fast-growing national firm fights co-op's legal battles", April 13, 1981
"Firm's critics even offer much praise for manager", April 13, 1981
"Small farmer leads co-op in crusade on 'parasites'", April 13, 1981
"Fast growth of co-ops brings fears of monopoly", April 14, 1981
"Farmers see dairy co-op as a blessing and a curse", April 15, 1981
"Milk system is costing the public in prices and taxes", April 16, 1981
"Dairy lobby lost battle, but the war is going on", April 16, 1981

 1982: (Honorable Mention) "The Federal Impact Series" by the Staff of the Sentinel Star (including Susan Taylor Martin, Larry Lipman, John C. Van Gieson, Wendy Spirduso, Thomas Sabulis, Jim Nesbitt, Sharon Carrasco, Scott Abrahams, Jim Clark, Charlie Jean, Alex Beasley, Robert Johnson Anne Groer, Keay Davidson, Noel Holston, Dean Johnson, Jim Runnels)

Articles in Series:
"In Orange County, Uncle Sam outspends them all", April 19, 1981
"Programs come and go, are swallowed and grow", April 19, 1981
"Grant writers: There's gold in them thar pens", April 19, 1981
"Orlando buys basics with handout aid", April 20, 1981
"Eatonville building future with government grants", April 20, 1981
"Construction firms built with low bids", April 20, 1981
"Community Coordinated Child Care", April 20, 1981
"Disney World doesn't make believe over funding", April 20, 1981
"Bidding rules bypassed on furniture buy", April 20, 1981
"Right numbers can add up to extra money", April 20, 1981
"Budget growth an economic Frankenstein", April 20, 1981
"Schools learn vital lesson in funding", April 21, 1981
"Aid to Orange County schools", April 21, 1981
"U.S. millions come rigged with strings", April 22, 1981
"If handouts dried up, tide of taxes would rise", April 22, 1981
"Training for 12 mechanics a costly lesson", April 22, 1981
"Does government encourage suits against county?", April 22, 1981
"Double reimbursement for trip prompts closer scrutiny of bills", April 22, 1981
"Friendly sky may lose its smile", April 22, 1981
"CETA's temporary status produced long-lasting effect", April 22, 1981
"EPA signs the check for sewer projects", April 22, 2019
"Tax dollars keep hotels loaded with conventioneers", April 22, 1981
"Military owns big guns of U.S. Funding", April 23, 1981
"VA money: a balm for battle scars", April 23, 1981
"Defense Contracts", April 23, 1981
"Military's tab a big receipt for economy", April 23, 1981
"Social Security setup helps 1 in 3", April 24, 1981
"Budget, benefits balloon with Social Security", April 24, 2019
"Home-building foundation wakes shape with U.S. help", April 24, 2019
"2 percent of flow trickles out as welfare", April 24, 2019
"Agriculture money fertilizes fairways, research programs", April 24, 1981
"Orange County just nibbling at loans to small businesses", April 24, 1981
"Uncle's presence", April 24, 1981
"Is HUD that flush?", April 24, 1981
"Medicare, Medicaid funds the lifeblood of hospitals", April 25, 1981
"Cutbacks might pull plug on local public TV shows", April 25, 1981
"Cultural groups singing for dollars", April 25, 1981
"Health-care aid gives shot in the arm to local programs", April 25, 1981
"Uncle Sam chipping in to fight rising crime rate", April 25, 1981
"Helping to educate and protect", April 25, 1981
"Dollars are routed to FBI hunts, drug busts", April 25, 1981
"Federal blueprint for building budget", April 25, 1981

 1983: "Series on the Failure of Penn Square Bank" by Phillip L. Zweig, American Banker
 1984: No award given
 1985: "The Tobacco Story" by Beth McLeo, Lawrence Spohn, Stan Swofford and Greta Tilley, Greensboro News & Record
 1986: "The Man Who Saved Nike" by Mark L. Zusman, Willamette Week
 1986: (Honorable Mention) Jan Brogan, Providence Journal-Bulletin
 1987: "Floating Point's Troubled Waters" by Brent Walth, Willamette Week
 1988: "Anatomy of a Takeover" by Paul Farhi, San Francisco Examiner
 1988: (Honorable Mention) "The Peyton School Story: A Gamble Lost" by Julie Bird, Colorado Springs Gazette Telegraph
 1989: "Towering Ambition" by Howard Gold, Miami Review

The series is about David Paul and Centrust Savings Bank.

 1990: "Calculated Madness: The Rise and Fall of Crazy Eddie Antar" by Gary Belsky and Phyllis Furman, Crain's New York Business
 1991: "A Requiem for Fashion" by Phyllis Furman and Linda Moss, Crain's New York Business

They were awarded for their writing on the effects of the AIDS epidemic on the fashion industry.

 1992: "Shocks to the System" by Emory Thomas Jr. and M. Rex Smith, Atlanta Business Chronicle
 1993: "Failing the Children" by Michael Hinkelman and Emory Thomas Jr., Atlanta Business Chronicle
 1994: "UC Inc." by Lance Williams, San Francisco Examiner

He was awarded for reports on financial misconduct and improprieties by high officials at the University of California.

 1995: "Wasteland" by Jim Lynch and Karen Dorn Steele, Spokesman-Review
 1996: "Oil's New Frontiers" by Kim Fararo, Anchorage Daily News
 1997: "River of No Return" by Lynda V. Mapes, The Spokesman-Review
 1998: "Borrowing Trouble" by Amy Hetzner and Amy Baldwin, Birmingham Post-Herald

They were awarded for "an investigative series detailing the state's lending practices and how it affects the poor."

 1999: "The Dairy Boom: Growth, Trouble and Transition" by Jennifer Hieger and Bill Heisel Jr., Yakima Herald-Republic
 2000: Harris Meyer, New Times Broward-Palm Beach

His story examined the ethical implications of physicians using multi-level marketing arrangements to sell health-related product to their patients.

Article:
"The Doctor Will Sell You Now", July 29. 1999

 2001: Bruce Rushton, The Riverfront Times

Article:
"Porn in the USA", November 29, 2000

 2002: "Foal Deaths" by Janet Patton, Lexington Herald-Leader

Articles in Series:
"Breeders alarmed at mounting foal losses", May 8, 2001
"Carcasses pile up, but the killer remains elusive", May 13, 2001
"Veterinary, farm workers affected by high foal loss", May 20, 2001
"The caterpillar keeps crawling back into the equation", May 22, 2001
"The answer was chewing on the leaves", May 27, 2001
"Foal death mystery remains, even as UK set to advise farms", September 30, 2001
"Foal loss exceeds 5,100, study says", October 16, 2001

 2003: "A License to Steal" by Eric Eyre and Scott Finn, The Charleston Gazette

Their series exposed secret deals among a "good ol' boy" network that increased prices. Their stories kept pressure on authorities and led to the cancellation of at least one deal as well as the resignation of a federal prosecutor and a state official.

Articles in Series:
"'A license to steal'", November 3, 2002
"School official resigns", November 2, 2002
"School officials subject to probe", November 1, 2002
"State equipment maintenance contract under review", November 15, 2002
"Flooded coffers", November 17, 2002
"Investigated company supplied Ground Zero rescuers", November 18, 2002
"State drops equipment repair deal", November 22, 2002
"School official was pressured for flood funds", December 1, 2002
"Flood insurance deal scuttled", December 8, 2002
"Following the floodwaters", December 8, 2002
"The go-to-guys", December 22, 2002

 2004: "Everybody at Risk" by Kate Long, The Charleston Gazette

Articles in Series:
"On The Edge", June 15, 2003
"We Sink Or Swim With Everyone Else", June 17, 2003
"Insurance: With & Without", August 3, 2003
"Cancel The Discount?", August 3, 2003
"Hospital Sticker Shock", August 3, 2003
"We Thought We Had Insurance", December 21, 2003

 2005: "The China Challenge" by Craig Troianello, Yakima Herald-Republic

Articles in Series:
"Apples to Apples", December 5, 2004
"Apples feed economy", December 6, 2004
"Peering into the future", December 7, 2004
"Meeting and competing", December 8, 2014

 2006: "School's Pursuit of Profit Leaves Students Behind" by Sam Kennedy and Christina Gostomski, The Morning Call 

Their story uses a local perspective to reveal the long-term effects of unscrupulous marketing, educational financing, and recruitment practices on unsophisticated students by for-profit educational enterprises.

Articles in Series:
"School's Pursuit of Profit Leaves Students Behind", April 24, 2005
"School Steers Students to Backbreaking Loans", May 22, 2005
"Dally Wants Hearing on School Loans", September 25, 2005
"Spotlight to be on Lehigh Valley College Loans", October 16, 2005
"High Interest Student Loan Hearing Moves to Capital", November 4, 2005
"Lawmakers Turn Up Heat On LVC Loans", November 10, 2005
“School Pulls Plug On Pricey Loan Program", February 23, 2006

 2007: "The Great Empire Zone Giveaway" by Mike McAndrew and Michelle Breidenbach, The Post-Standard

Articles in Series:
"Money for Nothing", September 17, 2006
"The tax-credit generators", September 17, 2006
"Pataki's plan short-circuited in Legislature", September 17, 2006
"No Small Change", September 24, 2006
"State inflates 'new job' counts", September 24, 2006
"Old Sabres, new money", September 24, 2006
"Without Promised Expansions, Pyramid Collects Millions", October 1, 2006
"Hou You Can Cut Your Utility Bill", October 8, 2006
"For top 10 firms, $56M in refunds for few jobs", October 8, 2006
"What Happens When Tax Breaks Are For Sale", November 19, 2006

 2008: "The China Effect" by Tony Bartelme, The Post and Courier

Articles in Series:
"Stem Cells: Miracle or mirage?", May 26, 2007
"The road to China", May 27, 2007
"Reality check", May 28, 2007
"China's rise has cost South Carolina jobs but it's also saving consumers money", April 29, 2007
"China's industry of knockoff Picassos, iPods, Viagra and more affects business worldwide", April 30, 2007
"Great pall of China: Smog dirties world's air", May 1, 2007
"The big squeeze", May 5, 2007
"Security at port is a quick scan away"May 6, 2007
"Charleston uses several security levels", May 6, 2007
"Hong Kong's t'ai chi", May 14, 2007

Gerald Loeb Award for Medium Newspapers (1987–2008)

 1987: "Technical Equities" by Edward O. Welles, San Jose Mercury News West Magazine
 1988: "Down and Out in the Middle Class" by David Sylvester, San Jose Mercury News
 1989: "Invisible Work Force" by S. Lynne Walker, The San Diego Union

The story is about illegal immigrant farm workers in San Diego County, California.

 1990: "Coverage of the Collapse of Charles H. Keating Jr.'s Lincoln Savings & Loan" by Jerry Kammer, Andy Hall and Team, The Arizona Republic
 1991: "Frank's Town" by Bill Dalton, Mike Hendricks and Chris Lester, The Kansas City Star

They were awarded for "a profile of Kansas City financier Frank Morgan."

 1992: "Adios Wisconsin: The Mexican Job Connection" by John Fauber and Jack Norman, The Milwaukee Journal
 1993: "Profits and Power: Japan's Foreign-Aid Machine" by Pete Carey and Lewis M. Simons, San Jose Mercury News
 1994: "The HMO Maze: How Medicare Fails Seniors" by Fred Schulte and Larry Keller, Sun-Sentinel

Articles in series:
"Elderly find HMOs can be a gamble", November 7, 1993
"Seniors divided over HMOs", November 7, 1993
"Grievance reports detail variety of woes", November 7, 1993
"Records outline status of South Florida HMOs", November 7, 1993
"Treatment Trouble", November 7, 1993
"Abuses plague HMOs", November 8, 1993
"Cost-reduction incentives under fire", November 8, 1993
"Warning to travelers: Better not get sick out there", November 8, 1993
"Power of Profits", November 8, 1993
"Monitoring of agents lax at times", November 8, 1993
"Staff turnover may hurt quality of care", November 9, 1993
"Medicare tab to climb 12.3%", November 9, 1993
"Plan's controls help raise quality, physician says ", November 9, 1993
"Bad to worse", November 9, 1993
"Patient says HMO doctor was abusive", November 9, 1993
"Grievance system criticized", November 10, 1993
"Medicare officials pledge to look into readers' complaints", November 10, 1993
"Long, hard road", November 10, 1993
"Reports on care not available to consumers", November 10, 1993
"Officials struggle with HMO regulation", November 11, 1993
"State officials promise action", November 11, 1993
"Tactics under fire", November 11, 1993
"HMO stays alive despite woes", November 11, 1993
"Through the cracks", November 11, 1993

 1995: "Stacking the Deck: The Birth of Louisiana Gambling" by Peter Nicholas, Susan Finch, Mark Schleifstein, Mike Hughlett and James O'Byrne, Times-Picayune
 1996: "Formula for Disaster: The Lodi Explosion" by Debra Lynn Vial, Michael Moore and Bruce Locklin, The Record

Articles in Series:
"Chain of errors left 5 dead", October 17, 1995
"Credentials of 'expert' misrepresented", October 17, 1995
"Lodi skirted safety laws", October 18, 1995
"Chemical Companies in Lodi", October 18, 1995
"Accident reveals weaknesses in oversight at many levels", October 19, 1995
"U.S. may add criminal charges", October 19, 1995
"OSHA's Findings", October 19, 1995

 1997: "Series of Investigative Reports on Comparator Systems Corp." by Cathy Taylor, Liz Pulliam and Elliot Blair Smith, Orange County Register
 1998: "House of Cards" by William Conroy, Nancy Shields, John T. Ward, Larry Arnold, Rick Linsk and Terri Somers, Asbury Park Press

They were awarded for seven stories from a year-long investigation and series of reports on a multimillion-dollar real estate fraud scheme in New Jersey and three other states. Their series led to state and federal investigations.

 1999: "Cosmetic Surgery: The Hidden Dangers" by Fred Schulte and Jenni Bergal, Sun-Sentinel

Their series and subsequent articles on cosmetic surgery deaths led the Florida Board of Medicine to tighten safety standards for office surgery.

Articles in Series:
"Plastic surgery: The risks you take", November 29, 1998
"Lack of regulations heightens surgical risks", November 30, 1998
"Training for laser surgery can be lax", November 30, 1998
"Patient briefing often sketchy", November 30, 1998
"Marketing blitz entices patients", December 1, 1998
"In the business of marketing body makeovers", December 1, 1998
"A cash cow or a lousy business", December 1, 1998
"Patients can nip and tuck now, pay later", December 1, 1998
"Clamping down on plastic surgeons", December 2, 1998
"Board moves to toughen plastic surgery rules", December 4, 1998
"Top doctor: Adopt surgery rules", December 5, 1998
"Plastic Surgeon to return to work", December 7, 1998
"Protecting plastic surgery patients", December 12, 1998

 2000: "A Killer in Our Food" by Alison Young, Jeffrey Taylor and Janet L. Fix, Detroit Free Press

Their series examined a nationwide lysteria outbreak and the subsequent recall and epidemiological investigation.

Articles in series:
"Scraps below, drips above: A some home for bacteria", August 23, 1999
"The hunt begins", August 24, 1999
"Crisis at Sara Lee", August 25, 1999
"Crisis fades, pain endures", August 26, 1999
"It can happen again", August 27, 1999

 2001: "Government Inc." by Robert Sargent, Ramsey Campbell, Jim Leusner and Sean Holton, The Orlando Sentinel

Their series "examined how Florida law allowed private developers to profit at the expense of homeowners."

Articles in Series:
"It takes a village to raise a fortune", October 15, 2000
"Top dollar for plain old stuff", October 15, 2000
"Playing by their own rules", October 15, 2000
"Players in the shadows, people in the dark", October 16, 2000
"Pockets of rebellion emerge here, there", October 16, 2000
"5 residents who refused to buckle under", October 16, 2000
"Country lawyer helps build a new city", October 17, 2000
"Lake official found a future at The Villages", October 17, 2000
"Falcon Trace quietly found home", October 17, 2000
"Islands of luxury", October 18, 2000
"Challenge holds up Osceola Trace", October 18, 2000

 2002: "Unequal Opportunity" by Jeffrey Meitrodt, Mark Schleifstein, Pamela Coyle and Ronette King, The Times-Picayune

Articles in Series:
"Pushed Aside", March 25, 2001
"Exploiting Opportunity", March 25, 2001
"Insecure Future", March 25, 2001
"Breaking Barriers", March 26, 2001
"Through the Cracks", March 27, 2001
"Ready-Mix DBE", March 27, 2001
"Numbers Game", March 27, 2001

 2003: "The CEO and His Church" by Deborah O'Neil and Jeff Harrington, St. Petersburg Times

Their investigation exposed the secret influential ties between a church and a public company.

Articles in Series:
"The CEO and His Church", June 2, 2002
"Separating belief and business", June 2, 2002

 2004: "Drugging the Poor" by Fred Schulte, South Florida Sun-Sentinel
 2005: "Danger Overhead: Crushed Roofs" by Bill Vlasic and Jeff Plungis, The Detroit News

Articles in Series:
"Thousands killed, hurt as auto roofs collapse", April 11, 2004
"Seat belts not enough to save lives in rollovers", April 12, 2004
"Feds, Big Three gird for roof showdown", April 13, 2004

 2006: "Ohio Rare Coin Funds" by Christopher Kirkpatrick, Joshua Boak, Steve Eder, Jim Drew and Mike Wilkinson, The Blade

Their series exposed major investment abuses by the Ohio workers' compensation board.

Articles in Series:
"Ohio agency sinks millions into rare coins", April 3, 2005
"Investors suffer when coin funds lose their luster; string of scandals tarnishes market", April 24, 2005
"Coin fund profits for state hinged on graders' opinions", May 30, 2005
"Documents show how BWC pumped cash into failing fund", June 17, 2005
"Coin trades offered huge upside for dealers", August 8, 2005
"BWC fires all its money managers", 2005
"Firm backed by rare-coin money supplied international stamp deal", 2005

 2006: (Honorable Mention) "Selling Drug Secrets" by Luke Timmerman and David Heath, The Seattle Times

Their highly detailed report exposed the practice of doctors being paid by financial firms for details about pending drug trials.

Articles in Series:
"Drug researchers leak secretsto Wall St.", August 7, 2005
"Investors quiz researcher in recorded conference call", August 7, 2005
"Selling secrets can distort data, kill promising drugs", August 7, 2005
"Some doctors see ethical pitfall in actions that others defend", August 7, 2005
"Sellers, buyers of secrets risk being prosecuted", August 7, 2005

 2007: "Crab Factory" by Chiaki Kawajiri, Gady A. Epstein, and Stephanie Desmon, The Baltimore Sun

Articles in Series:
"Crab Factory", April 30, 2006
"Helping Nature", April 30, 2006
"Working The Water", May 1, 2006
"'Made in USA'", May 1, 2006

 2008: "Sold a Nightmare" by Binyamin Appelbaum, Lisa Hammersly Munn, Ted Mellnik, Peter St. Onge and Liz Chandler, The Charlotte Observer

Articles in Series:
"Sold a nightmare", March 18, 2007
"One home save by a 2nd income", March 18, 2007
"Data wrong on some applications", March 18, 2007
"Beazer says it followed the law", March 18, 2007
"'$1 down' was an ominous sign", March 18, 2007
"House had code violations", March 18, 2007
"Homes with Beazer loans cost more", March 18, 2007
"Starter homes, sad endings", March 19, 2007
"How to buy your 1st home", March 19, 2007
"1 builder, hundreds of foreclosures", March 20, 2007
"Failed mortgages fly under the radar", March 21, 2007
"'No closing costs' add up fast", July 8, 2007
"Promises upfront, deals on the side", September 30, 2007
"Buyer blames himself – and agent", September 30, 2007
"Home loans were ill-fated", September 30, 2007
"New suburbs in fast decay", December 9, 2007
"The anatomy of a foreclosure crisis", December 9, 2007

Gerald Loeb Award for Medium & Small Newspapers (2009–2012)

 2009: "Borrowers Betrayed" by Jack Dolan, Matthew Haggman and Rob Barry, The Miami Herald
 2009: (Honorable Mention) "The Cruelest Cuts" by Ames Alexander, Peter St. Onge, Franco Ordoñez, Kerry Hall and Ted Mellnik, The Charlotte Observer

Articles in Series:
"House of Raeford Farms masks injuries inside Carolinas plants", February 10, 2008
"An epidemic of pain", February 10, 2008
"Poultry series exposes a new, silent subclass", February 10, 2008
"Fight and might", February 11, 2008
"Company Safety is our priority", February 11, 2008
"Some managers knew workers were illegal, former employees say", February 12, 2008
"A boss's view: Keep them working", February 12, 2008
"Workers say they're denied proper medical care", February 13, 2008
"Judge criticized Tyson guidelines", February 13, 2008
"A worker's grueling day", February 13, 2008
"Injured workers say they aren't given time off to heal", February 14, 2008
"Workplace inspections at 15-year low", February 15, 2008
"Regulators reduce company's fines", February 15, 2008
"Penalties reduced in violations involving dangerous chemicals", February 15, 2008
"Company avoids harshest sanction after fatal accident", February 15, 2008
"Inspectors knew of repetitive work pain in 1994", February 15, 2008
"House of Raeford: We're working to prevent injuries", February 15, 2008
"N.C. backs off poultry scrutiny", February 15, 2008
"Hearings planned on poultry workers", February 17, 2008
"Easley to seek poultry changes", 2008
"Berry plans no changes after stories on poultry", March 9, 2008
"Lawmakers: Toughen poultry plant penalties", April 2, 2008
"Doctors feel push to downplay injuries", April 19, 2008
"Senators want OSHA's injury reports probed", 2008
"Family devastated, plant fined $2,500", April 26, 2008
"Measure would aid poultry workers", 2008

 2010: "Keys to the Kingdom: How State Regulators Enabled a $7 Billion Ponzi Scheme" by Michael Sallah, Rob Barry and Lucy Komisar, The Miami Herald

Articles in Series:
"State aided suspect in huge swindle", July 5, 2009
"Stanford case puts lawyers in spotlight", October 4, 2009
"Feds eye Stanford's many ties to Congress", December 27, 2009

 2011: "Hounded - Debtors and the New Breed of Collectors" by Chris Serres and Glenn Howatt, Minneapolis Star Tribune

Articles in Series:
"In jail [for being] in debt", June 6, 2010
"Is jailing debtors the same as debtors jail?", June 6, 2010
"What to know: Avoiding warrants". June 6, 2010
"Justice denied as debt seizures soar", August 29, 2010
"How garnishment works in Minnesota", August 29, 2010
"Criminals land jobs as debt collectors", December 12, 2010
"Would you give them your credit card number?", December 12, 2010

 2011: "Seniors for Sale" Michael J. Berens The Seattle Times

Articles in Series:
"Seniors for sale", January 31, 2010
"State-required training for prospective owners has serious flaws", January 31, 2010
"Deaths in adult homes hidden and ignored", September 12, 2010
"How to recognize and prevent pressure sores", September 12, 2010
"Bed brokers scramble to cash in", December 12, 2010

 2012: "Shattered Trust" by Raquel Rutledge, Rick Barrett, John Diedrich, Ben Poston and Mike de Sisti of Milwaukee Journal Sentinel

Articles in Series
"Shattered Trust", June 26, 2011
"A look at the Triad case", June 26, 2011
"Video", June 26, 2011
"Are recalled wipes still in use?", July 17, 2011
"Pads used despite bacterium", September 22, 2011
"FDA falling short on safety checks", December 28, 2011
"Priorities, staffing impede oversight", December 28, 2011

 2012: "Inside Amazon's Warehouse" by Spencer Soper and Scott Kraus, The Morning Call

Articles in Series:
"Inside Amazon's Warehouse", September 18, 2011
"Amazon gets heat over warehouse", September 25, 2011
"Amazon workers left out in the cold", November 6, 2011

Gerald Loeb Award for Small & Medium Newspapers (2013–2014)

 2013: "Prognosis: Profits" Ames Alexander, Karen Garloch, Joseph Neff and David Raynor, The Charlotte Observer and The News & Observer

Articles in Series:
"Nonprofit hospitals thrive on profits", April 22, 2012
"Most N.C. horpitals slim on charity care", April 23, 2012
"Who pays for the patients?", April 23, 2012
"Carolinas HealthCare System statement", April 23, 2012
"Hospital suits force new pain on patients", April 24, 2012
"Hospital's clout in capital built with money, contacts", April 25, 2012
"Prices soar as hospitals dominate cancer market", September 23, 2012
"Same drug, different prices", September 23, 2012
"How we reported the story", September 23, 2012

 2013: "Ghost Workers", Mandy Locke and David Raynor, The News & Observer

Articles in Series:
"Employees pay the price of workers' comp neglect", April 1, 2012
"What is worker's comp?", April 1, 2012
"Cheating employers make it tough to compete", August 19, 2012
"Struggling to stay in U.S., he feels invisible", August 19, 2012
"Employee vs. contractor", August 19, 2012
"Injured worker pays for employer's gamble", August 20, 2012
"What's the difference", August 20, 2012
"The skinny on worker's comp", August 20, 2012
"Inept bureaucracy lets unlawful businesses win", August 22, 2012

 2014: "Deadly Delays" by Ellen Gabler, Mark Johnson, John Fauber, Allan James Vestal, and Kristyna Wentz-Graff, Milwaukee Journal Sentinel

See also
 Gerald Loeb Award winners for Large Newspapers
 Gerald Loeb Award winners for Newspaper

References

External links
 Gerald Loeb Award historical winners list

American journalism awards
Gerald Loeb Award winners